Until the Birds Return, is a 2017 French drama film directed by Karim Moussaoui. It was screened in the Un Certain Regard section at the 2017 Cannes Film Festival.

Cast
 Aure Atika
 Nadia Kaci

References

External links
 

2017 films
2017 drama films
2017 directorial debut films
2010s Arabic-language films
French drama films
2010s French-language films
1091 Media films
Arabic-language films
2010s French films